Yishui County is a county of south-central Shandong province, People's Republic of China, located in the foothills region of the province. It is the northernmost county-level division of the prefecture-level city of Linyi.

Administrative divisions
As 2012, this County is divided to 13 towns and 6 townships.
Towns

Townships

Climate

References

External links 
 Official homepage

Counties of Shandong
Linyi